Rain in a Dry Land is a 2006 documentary film directed by Anne Makepeace and filmed by Joan Churchill & Barney Broomfield that chronicles the experiences of two Bantu as they are transported by relief organizations from Kenyan refugee camps to Atlanta, Georgia and then Springfield, Massachusetts.

Rain in a Dry Land Makepeace also wrote and produced the documentary and was broadcast as part of PBS's Point of View series.

References

External links

 Makepeace Productions website - Makepeace Productions website

2006 films
POV (TV series) films
Documentary films about refugees
Documentary films about immigration to the United States
2000s English-language films
2000s American films